Pleasant Valley Township is a township in Decatur County, Kansas, USA.  As of the 2000 census, its population was 46.

Geography

The stream of Big Timber Creek runs through this township.

References
 USGS Geographic Names Information System (GNIS)

External links
 US-Counties.com
 City-Data.com

Townships in Decatur County, Kansas
Townships in Kansas